Darrell Davis (born March 10, 1966) is a former American football defensive end. He played for the New York Jets from 1990 to 1991.

References

1966 births
Living people
American football defensive ends
TCU Horned Frogs football players
New York Jets players